Martin Petráš (born 2 November 1979 in Bojnice) is a Slovak football central defender who previously played for A.C. Delta Porto Tolle. He made 38 appearances for the Slovakia national football team. He measures 186 cm, weighing 82 kg.

Career
Having previously played with Baník Prievidza in his homeland, Petráš moved to the Czech Republic with FK Jablonec 97 in 2000, before joining Sparta Prague in 2002. During the 2005–06 season he scored a goal for his club in the Champions League against Dutch giants Ajax Amsterdam. Following this he was purchased by FBK Kaunas in January 2006 and immediately loaned to Scottish side Heart of Midlothian.

After only 5 appearances for the Edinburgh club, Petráš returned to FBK Kaunas and was released in July 2006. He then signed for newly relegated U.S. Lecce, making his debut in a 3–1 win over AlbinoLeffe on 9 September 2006. In January 2007 he moved to Treviso on loan. He moved to Cesena in 2009, making 29 appearances. He was then sold to Grosseto on 31 January 2011.

At the brink of his career, Petráš became the first Slovak footballer to compete in San Marino.

References

External links
 Appearance stats at londonhearts.com
 

1979 births
Living people
Sportspeople from Bojnice
Slovak footballers
Slovak expatriate footballers
U.S. Lecce players
FK Jablonec players
AC Sparta Prague players
Treviso F.B.C. 1993 players
Heart of Midlothian F.C. players
U.S. Triestina Calcio 1918 players
A.C. Cesena players
F.C. Grosseto S.S.D. players
S.P. La Fiorita players
Footballers at the 2000 Summer Olympics
Olympic footballers of Slovakia
Slovakia under-21 international footballers
Slovakia international footballers
Slovak Super Liga players
Scottish Premier League players
Czech First League players
Serie B players
Campionato Sammarinese di Calcio players
Expatriate footballers in the Czech Republic
Expatriate footballers in Italy
Expatriate footballers in Scotland
Expatriate footballers in San Marino
Slovak expatriate sportspeople in Scotland
Slovak expatriate sportspeople in the Czech Republic
Slovak expatriate sportspeople in Italy
Slovak expatriate sportspeople in San Marino
2010 FIFA World Cup players
Association football defenders